The Suho Memorial Paper Museum is a museum about paper in Zhongshan District, Taipei, Taiwan.

History
The idea of the paper museum establishment was voiced by Chen Su-ho, the founder of Chang Chuen Cotton Paper. However, he died in an airplane accident in October 1990 in Guangdong. Soon after that, the preparation to establish the museum took off. The museum was finally opened in October 1995 after five years of preparation with the name Suho Memorial Paper Museum.

Architecture
The museum is housed in a 4-story building with a total floor area of 529 m2. It features a shop.

Exhibitions
 Show room and paper mill
 Suho platform special exhibition
 Permanent exhibition area of the museum
 Activity experience area

Transportation
The museum is accessible within walking distance South from Songjiang Nanjing Station of the Taipei Metro.

See also
 List of museums in Taiwan

References

External links
 

1995 establishments in Taiwan
Museums established in 1995
Museums in Taipei